Trikk is a Portuguese electronic musician born in Porto, Portugal. His music has been released by a number of different labels, including Innervisions.

EPs and singles
Wat U Do / All This Time (Con+ainer, 2012)
Jointly / I Fall Down (ManMakeMusic, 2012)
Midnight Sequence / Back To Back / Labour 91 / Prime Time (Hyper_LTD, 2013)
Basement Traxx EP (ManMakeMusic, 2013)
Deeper Point / Houx 93 / Bliss Drive / Straight Circles (Truesoul, 2014)
Firma / Liberal (Pets Recordings, 2015)
Abstract Language / Deviation 33 (ManMakeMusic, 2015)
Subito / Functional (Pets Recordings, 2015)
Proto Rhyth (Black Version / Bodies (Modern Dub) (Lossless, 2016)
Several (Gysin Dub) / Esplendor / General System / Modo Ritmico (Optimo Trax, 2016)
Florista / Mozam / Veneno / Wardance Dub (Innervisions, 2016)
Mundo Ritual (Innervisions, 2017)
Vilara / Devila (Innervisions, 2018)

Other EPs and singles
Catz’ N Dogz Presents Body Language Volume 12 (Get Physical Music, 2012) 
Friends Will Carry You Home Too Pt. 2 (Pets Recordings, 2013)
George Fitzgerald - Thinking Of You (Hotflush Recordings, 2013)
Alma (Pets Recordings - VA - 2013)
Uncore 95 (Drumcode - VA - 2014)
Volta (Balance Music Mix - 2016)
Outbound.2 - Trikk - Return To Order (N.Y Dub) (Lossless, 2017)
Fabric 97: Tale Of Us - Trikk - Metala (Fabric, 2018)

External links
Discography at Discogs.com

Portuguese electronic musicians
1991 births
Living people
Musicians from Porto